"No Matter What" is the fourth single from freestyle singer George Lamond's debut album Bad of the Heart featuring Brenda K. Starr. In 1993, Lamond recorded a Spanish-language version as "No Morirá" with Lisa Lopez on his album Creo en Ti.

Track listing
US CD single

Charts

Dark Latin Groove version

In 1996, New York salsa band Dark Latin Groove covered "No Morirá" as their debut single from the eponymous album. The single peak at #12 on the Hot Latin Tracks chart and #1 on the Latin Tropical Airplay. The single spent three weeks at #1 on the chart. Jorge Luis Piloto received an award at the Tropical category on the American Society of Composers, Authors and Publishers Awards of 1997.

Weekly charts

Year-end charts

See also
List of Billboard Tropical Airplay number ones of 1996

References

1990 singles
1996 debut singles
Brenda K. Starr songs
Dark Latin Groove songs
George Lamond songs
Song recordings produced by Chris Barbosa
Song recordings produced by Sergio George
1990 songs
Columbia Records singles
Sony Discos singles
Salsa songs